Johnny Mold is a pro snowmobile racer from Pine City, Minnesota.  Nicknamed Jammin', he made eight of 10 finals on the WSA National Series in '03/'04.

Competitive history
Year, Event, Location, Sport, Discipline (Finish):
2004 WSA Canterbury National, Minneapolis, MN, SNX, Pro Stock (12th)
2004 WSA Canterbury National, Minneapolis, MN, SNX, Pro Open (6th)
2004 WSA National, Shawano, WI, SNX, Pro Open (10th)
2003 WSA Park-X National, Hill City, MN, SNX, Pro Stock (11th)
2003 WSA Park-X National, Hill City, MN, SNX, Pro Open (10th)
2003 WSA National, Winnipeg, MB, SNX, Pro Stock (8th)
2003 WSA National, Winnipeg, MB, SNX, Pro Open (11th)
2003 WSA Spirit Mtn. National, Duluth, MN, SNX, Pro Open (6th)
2001 WSA Regional, Thief River Falls, MN, SMB Pro 440 (1st)

X-Games history
Year, Sport, Discipline (Finish):
Winter 2004 SMB Snocross (24th)
Winter 2002 SMB Snocross (24th)

References

External links
Power Sports Snowmobile Tour

Living people
People from Pine City, Minnesota
Year of birth missing (living people)